Cumberland Historic District is a national historic district located at Cumberland, Indiana.  It encompasses 91 contributing buildings in the Cumberland section of Indianapolis.  The district developed between about 1831 and 1950, and includes representative examples of Folk Victorian and Bungalow / American Craftsman style architecture. Notable contributing resources include the Cumberland Bank (1907), Masonic Lodge (c. 1910), Miller's Lunch, and First Baptist Church (1912-1913).

It was listed on the National Register of Historic Places in 2001.

References

Historic districts on the National Register of Historic Places in Indiana
Victorian architecture in Indiana
Bungalow architecture in Indiana
Historic districts in Indianapolis
National Register of Historic Places in Indianapolis